Myron Leskiw (1909–1997) was born in Pidtarkiv, Russian Empire in 1909 and emigrated to the United States in 1930. He became a U.S. citizen in 1936, and in 1942 joined the United States Army Air Corps. Mr. Leskiw served with the 490th Bomb Squadron in Burma, India, and in the China offensive, and was the recipient of the Air Service Medal and Asiatic Pacific Service Medal.

He is well known for his activities in support of the political aspirations of the Ukrainian community. He died on August 7 after a prolonged illness. In 1931 he joined the Ukrainian National Association. In 1933 he was a co-organizer of the Organization for the Rebirth of Ukraine, which he served as a national director and administrator.

In 1947 he was a co-founder of the Organization for Defense of Four Freedoms for Ukraine. In 1950 he was elected to the national board of the Ukrainian Congress Committee of America. In addition Mr. Leskiw was active in the Ukrainian National Association.

Mr. Leskiw was among the first to recognize the value of organizing ethnic nationalities in solidarity with a major American political parties. In 1948 he organized the Ukrainian Republican Committee of the State of New Jersey and was state chairman of the Ukrainian American Republican Association. Active in numerous Republican campaigns, he worked for Sen. Clifford Case, Presidents Dwight D. Eisenhower and Richard Nixon, Sen. Barry Goldwater and numerous New Jersey gubernatorial candidates.

He served as state chairman of the Ukrainian Division, United Citizens for Nixon-Agnew in 1968, and founded the Republican Heritage Groups Federation of New Jersey, acting as its first chairman. In 1972 Mr. Leskiw served as an alternate delegate to the Republican National Convention.

As a longtime resident of Newark, New Jersey, he retired from the Western Electric Company, was a member of Local 1470 of the AFL-CIO and a life member of the Telephone Pioneers of America. He was survived by his wife, Mary Leskiw; and his three children, Mary Tucciarone, Margie Pierce and Donald Leskiw; as well as six grandchildren and his sister, Katherine.

Currently, his position papers, newspaper articles and personal correspondence are held at the Immigration History Research Center at the University of Minnesota.

External links
Immigration History Research Center; Myron Leskiw
Political Graveyard
The Ukrainian Weekly

1909 births
Soviet emigrants to the United States
1997 deaths
United States Army Air Forces soldiers
United States Army personnel of World War II